Bereya is a rural locality (a station) in Bereyinsky Selsoviet of Shimanovsky District, Amur Oblast, Russia. The population was 80 as of 2018.

Geography 
It is located 23 km north-west from Shimanovsk.

References 

Rural localities in Shimanovsky District